A calling, in the religious sense of the word, is a religious vocation (which comes from the Latin for "call") that may be professional or voluntary and, idiosyncratic to different religions, may come from another person, from a divine messenger, or from within oneself.

History

The idea of a vocation or "calling" has played a significant role within Christianity. Since the early days of the Christian faith, the term has applied to candidates for the clergy. It soon began to be applied to those who felt drawn to a more rigorous observance of their faith through the contemplative lifestyle of the hermits and monks and nuns.

Later, Martin Luther taught that each individual was expected to fulfill their God-appointed task in everyday life. Although the Lutheran concept of the calling emphasized vocation, there was no particular emphasis on labor beyond what was required for one's daily bread. Calvinism transformed the idea of the calling by emphasizing relentless, disciplined labor. Calvin defined the role of "the Christian in his vocation", noting that God has prescribed appointed duties to men and styled such spheres of life vocations or callings. Calvinists distinguished two callings: a general calling to serve God and a particular calling to engage in some employment by which one's usefulness is determined.

The Puritan minister Cotton Mather discussed the obligations of the personal calling, writing of "some special business, and some settled business, wherein a Christian should for the most part spend the most of his time; so he may glorify God by doing good for himself". Mather admonished that it was not lawful ordinarily to live without some calling: "for men will fall into "horrible snares and infinite sins"". This idea has endured throughout the history of Protestantism. Almost three centuries after John Calvin's death in 1564 Thomas Carlyle would proclaim, "The latest Gospel in this world is, 'know thy work and do it.'"

The legacy of this religious ethic continues to exert its influence in secular Western society. Modern occupations which are seen as vocations often include those where a combination of skill and community help are implied, such as medical, care-giving, and veterinary occupations. Occupations where rewards are seen more in spiritual or other non-financial terms, such as religious occupations, are also seen as vocations. Borderline occupations, where community service and more personal reward are more evenly balanced, such as politics, may often be regarded as vocations.

Distinctions among different denominations

Catholicism and Orthodoxy

In both the Catholic Church and the Eastern Orthodox Churches, a candidate to the diaconate and priesthood is referred to as being called to this service in the Church. The term is also used for those in consecrated life.

Protestant churches
In Protestant churches, the decision of a church to invite for appointment a particular minister - to "invite in due form to the pastorate of a church (Presbyterian or Nonconformist)" (OED) may be referred to as a call, such as extending a call to so and so, and is first cited from 1560 by the OED. In Evangelicalism, the sense of deliberate purpose before God is generally an expected part of the choice to seek ministerial work in the first place and is often referred to as a calling or call.

Latter-day Saints
The Church of Jesus Christ of Latter-day Saints describes a calling as "a duty, position, or responsibility in the Church that is issued to a member by priesthood leaders.... [it is] an opportunity to serve." The church uses a lay clergy, with most members receiving no compensation for the execution of their callings. Prominent church leader J. Reuben Clark said, "In the service of the Lord, it is not where you serve but how. In the [church], one takes the place to which one is duly called, which place one neither seeks nor declines." Prior to beginning service, a person is presented to church membership for a sustaining vote to that calling. The person is then set apart to serve in the calling by the laying on of hands.

See also 
 Otium

References

Christian religious occupations
Religious terminology

ja:召命